Yariabad may refer to:

Yariabad, Lorestan
Yariabad, Qazvin
Yariabad, alternate name of Aliabad, Dashtabi, Qazvin

See also
Yarabad (disambiguation)